Janet Marie Dicks (born February 6, 1933) is a retired American weight thrower. In 1952 she won both the national titles and U.S. Olympic trials in the shot put and discus throw. At the 1952 Summer Olympics, she competed only in the shot put and placed 18th. The following year, she won her third and last national title, in the discus. Between 1951 and 1957 she had 10 finishes within the first four places at the national championships in the shot put, discus throw and javelin throw.

References

External links 
 

American female shot putters
American female discus throwers
American female javelin throwers
1933 births
Living people
Olympic track and field athletes of the United States
Athletes (track and field) at the 1952 Summer Olympics
21st-century American women